Altenkirchen is a municipality in the north of the island of Rügen on the Baltic Sea coast of Germany. It is in the Vorpommern-Rügen district, in the federal state of Mecklenburg-Vorpommern.

It is the only land access to its eastern neighbour Putgarten, which includes Kap Arkona, the northernmost point of the island.

It includes the localities of Drewoldke, Gudderitz, Lanckensburg, Mattchow, Schwarbe, Presenske, Wollin and Zühlitz.

Its name derives from its famous parish church, whose construction is believed to have commenced around 1185.

References

External links